Days of War is a multiplayer first-person shooter video game developed and published by Driven Arts. It was released for Microsoft Windows through Steam Early Access on January 26, 2017. The game is set to fully release for Microsoft Windows, in 2020. The game allows up to thirty-two players in a World War II setting.

Gameplay 
Days of War will feature four types of gameplay: capture the flag; deathmatch; search and destroy; and domination. Players will be able to select from six classes of infantry including: rifleman; machine gunner; and sniper.

See also 
 Battalion 1944
 Day of Defeat

References

External links 
 

2017 video games
Multiplayer and single-player video games
PlayStation 4 games
Tactical shooter video games
Unreal Engine games
Video games developed in the United States
Windows games
World War II first-person shooters
Xbox One games